Repentance (Italian: Pentimento) is a 1952 Italian melodrama film directed by Mario Costa and starring Paul Muller, Eva Nova and Nyta Dover.  The film's sets were designed by the art director Franco Fontana.

Cast
 Paul Muller as Berardo Morelli
 Eva Nova as 	Margherita D'Angelo
 Nyta Dover as 	Ninì Dorè
 Cesare Danova as Sandro
 Bruno Corelli	
 Doris Duranti 
 Enrico Glori		
 Gino Latilla 		
 Antonella Lualdi  	
 Dante Maggio 	
 Pamela Palma		
 Nilla Pizzi
 Leopoldo Valentini

References

Bibliography 
 Chiti, Roberto & Poppi, Roberto. Dizionario del cinema italiano: Dal 1945 al 1959. Gremese Editore, 1991.
 Morreale, Emiliano. Così piangevano: Il cinema melò nell'Italia degli anni cinquanta. Donzelli Editore, 2011.

External links 
 

1952 films
Italian drama films
1952 drama films
1950s Italian-language films
Films directed by Mario Costa
1950s Italian films

it:Pentimento (film 1952)